"The Torrents" is a 1969 Australian TV play based on the stage play by Oriel Gray. It was filmed as part of the ABC anthology drama series Australian Plays. It was the second Gray play adapted by the ABC, after Burst of Summer.

Australian TV drama was relatively rare at the time.

Cast
Barbara Stephens
Ken Shorter
Alan Hopgood
Mark Albiston
Harold Hopkins*
Lyndell Rowe.

Production
It was shot in Melbourne and at Maldon, a small town outside Bendigo. It was designed by Alan Clarke. Railway carriages were hired from the Society of Railway Enthusiasts. The budget could not cover the hiring of an old locomotive so a modern one was used, but this was obscured by a fog machine.

Reception
One critic called it "a beauty".

References

External links
 
 
 

1960s Australian television plays
1969 Australian television episodes
1969 television plays
Australian Plays (season 1) episodes